Je Bho Ramrai Bho (Nepali:जे भो राम्रै भो) is a 2003 Nepali film directed by Hari Bansha Acharya.

Cast
 Hari Bansha Acharya ...  Nabin/Rabin
 Rajesh Hamal... Shambhu
 Jal Shah ...  Nabina
 Madan Krishna Shrestha

See also

Cinema of Nepal
List of Nepalese films

External links
 
 

2003 films
Nepalese action films
2000s Nepali-language films
2003 action films
Films shot in Kathmandu